Lydia Kallipoliti is a Greek architect, engineer, architectural historian, action researcher, and scholar. Her work examines interdisciplinary studies involving architecture, technology, and environmental politics.

Early life and education 
Kallipoliti grew up in Thessaloniki where she graduated from Anatolia College in 1994. She studied at Aristotle University of Thessaloniki, and graduated with a diploma in architecture and engineering.  She has an Master of Science in architecture studies from MIT, a Master of Arts and a PhD from Princeton University.

Career 
Kallipoliti was a visiting fellow at the Canadian Center for Architecture, the University of Queensland, and a visiting critic at the University of Technology Sydney. She currently works as an assistant professor at the Cooper Union for the Advancement of Science and Art in New York. She had been an assistant professor at Rensselaer Polytechnic Institute, Syracuse University, and an assistant professor Adjunct at Columbia Graduate School of Architecture, Planning and Preservation. She manages ANAcycle a design studio and thinktank based in New York.

Exhibitions 
In 2016, she curated the Closed Worlds exhibition at the Storefront for Art and Architecture in New York, funded by a grant awarded by New York State Council on the Arts in 2015. Other editions of the exhibition were held at Woodbury University School of Architecture's WUHO Gallery, and at the University of Technology Sydney's Art Gallery.

Awards 
 2010: Webby Awards. 

 2014: Graham Foundation Production and Presentation Grant for her Closed Worlds exhibition project. 

 2017: Creative Achievement Award from the Association of Collegiate Schools of Architecture. 

 2020: Tallinn Architecture Biennale 2022.

Bibliography

Books 
EcoRedux: Design Remedies for an Ailing Planet (Architectural Design) (2010), published by Wiley 
The Architecture of Closed Worlds (2018), published by Lars Müller Publishers 
History of Ecological Design (2018), published by Oxford Research Encyclopedia of Environmental Science 
Contaminating the Red Planet (2019), published by The Design Museum 
Chapter 14: Big Dog, Or, The Precarious Aesthetics of Tumbling (2019), published by MIT Press

Review articles and research papers 
Closed Worlds: The Rise and Fall of Dirty Physiology (2015), published in Architectural Theory Review 
From Shit to Food: Graham Caine's Eco-House in South London, 1972–1975 (2012), published in  Buildings & Landscapes: Journal of the Vernacular Architecture Forum 
The Soft Cosmos of AD’s ‘Cosmorama’ in the 1960s and 1970s (2010), published in Architectural Design 
 No More Schisms (2010), published in Architectural Design 
Dry Rot: The Chemical Origins of British Preservation  (2010), published in Future Anterior 
On Interference: Designing Strange Life Forms that Don’t Always Listen (2019), published in Ardeth 
Endangered pieces of nature and the architecture of closed worlds (2015), published in Volume

See also 

Souzána Antonakáki
Elisabeth Sakellariou
Theano Fotiou

References

External links 
Tallinn Architecture Biennale TAB 2022 Official website
Page on Academia
ANAcycle thinktank website
The Closed Worlds Project Website

Greek architects
Greek scholars
Greek academics
Architectural historians
Year of birth missing (living people)
Living people
Cooper Union faculty
Engineers from Thessaloniki